Lisel Haas (1898–1989) was a German female photographer. She worked as a photographer at the Birmingham Repertory Theatre where she photographed many plays. She obtained work with the theatre in 1940, photographing almost every production until she left Birmingham in 1962. During this time many promising actors appeared including Paul Schofield, Albert Finney, Ian Richardson and Derek Jacobi. She also covered productions at the Alexandra Theatre in Birmingham, the Belgrade Theatre in Coventry and the Kidderminster Playhouse. After the Second World War she was able to set up her own photographic studio at her home in Moseley. She worked from here until she left Birmingham.

Early life
Lisel Haas was born in Mönchengladbach, Germany in 1898 to Jewish parents. She worked as a portrait photographer and photojournalist. Her special interests were urban childhood, travelling communities and religious practice. On 18 October 1938 she was issued with a decree from the Gladbach Police Authority stipulating that she must display a notice in the window of her photographic studio stating that it was a 'Jewish business' with threat of punishment. Following Kristallnacht in November 1938 she abandoned her studio and left Germany with her father. Their application for asylum in the United States was turned down so they turned to Britain and arrived in Birmingham in December 1938.

Using photographs as a 'universal language'
Through the medium of photography Haas attempted to create a 'universal language' through which we are able to remember events and personal memories. She believed that 'life' provided the link between her and her sitters and gave their force and effect. Photography, she felt, was charged by life and by living. Amy Shulman argued that through the medium of photography Haas attempted to create a 'universal language' for both personal and collective memories.

Legacy
The Birmingham City Archives held in the Library of Birmingham include original photographs and Lisel Haas' papers.

References

External links
 Haas' pictures in the Birmingham Rep Archives

People from Mönchengladbach
People from Moseley
Photographers from North Rhine-Westphalia
German women photographers
1898 births
Jewish emigrants from Nazi Germany to the United Kingdom
German photojournalists
1989 deaths
20th-century German photographers
20th-century women photographers
20th-century German women
Women photojournalists